It's Dark and Hell Is Hot is the debut album by American rapper DMX. It was released on May 19, 1998, by Def Jam Recordings and Ruff Ryders Entertainment. It was supported by four singles—"Get at Me Dog", "Stop Being Greedy", "Ruff Ryders' Anthem" and "How's It Goin' Down", in order of release—and their accompanying music videos.

It primarily includes production from Dame Grease (13 tracks) and PK (8 tracks), in addition to production from Irv Gotti and Lil Rob (2 tracks), Younglord (1 track; add.), and Swizz Beatz (1 track). The album is widely considered a classic among hip hop fans and critics.

Critical reception

It's Dark and Hell Is Hot was met with positive reviews from music critics. AllMusic commented that "Unlike so many other hardcore rappers who are more rhetorical than physical, DMX commands an aggressive aura without even speaking a word." Leading hip-hop magazine The Source described the album as "a mind-gripping opus that fully encompasses the appeal of one of rap's newest sensations."

Commercial performance
It's Dark and Hell Is Hot debuted at number one on the US Billboard 200 chart, selling 251,000 copies in its first week, the first DMX number one debut on the chart. On December 18, 2000, the album was certified four times platinum by the Recording Industry Association of America (RIAA) for shipments of four million copies in the US.

Legacy 
Andrew R. Chow from TIME Magazine published a article about the album on the day of DMX's passing (April 9, 2021) saying, "Then 27-year-old Earl Simmons, better known as DMX, released his debut album It’s Dark and Hell Is Hot, and everything changed. The album was full of violent nihilism, hair-raising tales of betrayal and revenge, and his emulations of dogs barking and whining; the beats were rugged and skeletal. Rather than being rejected or pigeonholed, the album immediately skyrocketed to the top of the charts, selling 251,000 copies in its first week in the U.S as songs like “Ruff Ryders’ Anthem” rang out of every car stereo in New York City and beyond." He also wrote the album was catalyst for American producer Swizz Beatz's career and influenced artists later on like American rapper Denzel Curry, who listed it as one of his favorite albums. Nas reminisced in 2013, “that was the year DMX took over the world."

In 2015, Pitchfork wrote, "The debut album from DMX is the Dante’s Inferno of rap. His infamous stage presence and aggression gave a voice to the voiceless in the streets of New York and overnight changed the course of hip-hop." In 2022, Rolling Stone ranked the album twenty-second on their list of The 200 Greatest Hip-Hop Albums of All Time.

Canadian recording artist Drake interpolated “How’s It Going Down” on his 2016 song “U With Me". He personally asked DMX for his permission.

Track listing 

 Notes
 Track listing and credits from album booklet.
 "X-Is Coming" features additional vocals by Jamie, Warren and Randy.
 "How's It Goin' Down" features additional vocals by Lovey Ford and Schamika Grant.
 "I Can Feel It" features additional vocals by Nardo.

 Sample credits
 "Intro" contains a sample of "Beyond Forever" performed by James Mtume.
 "Fuckin' wit' D" contains a sample of "Shifting Gears" performed by Johnny "Hammond" Smith.
 "Get At Me Dog" contains a sample of "Everything Good to You" performed by B. T. Express.
 "Let Me Fly" contains a sample of "Lo Dudo" performed by José José.
 "Damien" contains a sample of "Slow Dance" performed by Stanley Clarke.
 "How's It Going Down" contains a sample of "God Made Me Funky" performed by The Headhunters.
 "Crime Story" contains a sample of "Easin' In" performed by Edwin Starr.
 "Stop Being Greedy" contains a sample of "My Hero Is a Gun" performed by Diana Ross.
 "I Can Feel It" contains a sample of "In the Air Tonight" performed by Phil Collins.
 "The Convo" contains a sample of "Nights on Broadway" performed by The Bee Gees, and an interpolation of "Somebody's Knockin'" performed by Terri Gibbs.
 "Niggaz Done Start Something" contains a sample of "Mercy, Mercy Me (The Ecology)" performed by Marvin Gaye.

Courtesies
 The Lox and Mase appear courtesy of Bad Boy Records.
 Big Stan, Loose and Drag-On appears courtesy of Ruff Ryders Entertainment.
 Kasino appears courtesy of Jive Records.

Charts

Weekly charts

Year-end charts

Certifications

See also
List of number-one albums of 1998 (U.S.)
List of number-one R&B albums of 1998 (U.S.)

References

1998 debut albums
DMX (rapper) albums
Def Jam Recordings albums
PolyGram albums
Ruff Ryders Entertainment albums
Albums produced by Dame Grease
Albums produced by Irv Gotti
Albums produced by Swizz Beatz
Albums recorded at Chung King Studios
Horrorcore albums